Ústí nad Orlicí District(German: Bezirk Wildenschwert) is a district (okres) within Pardubice Region of the Czech Republic. Its capital is the town of Ústí nad Orlicí. The district has borders with Pardubice District to the west, Svitavy District to the south and Chrudim District to the southwest.

List of municipalities

 Albrechtice
 Anenská Studánka
 Běstovice
 Bošín
 Brandýs nad Orlicí
 Bučina
 Bystřec
 Čenkovice
 Červená Voda
 Česká Rybná
 Česká Třebová
 České Heřmanice
 České Libchavy
 České Petrovice
 Choceň
 Cotkytle
 Damníkov
 Dlouhá Třebová
 Dlouhoňovice
 Dobříkov
 Dolní Čermná
 Dolní Dobrouč
 Dolní Morava
 Džbánov
 Hejnice
 Helvíkovice
 Hnátnice
 Horní Čermná
 Horní Heřmanice
 Horní Třešňovec
 Hrádek
 Hrušová
 Jablonné nad Orlicí
 Jamné nad Orlicí
 Javorník
 Jehnědí
 Kameničná
 Klášterec nad Orlicí
 Koldín
 Kosořín
 Králíky
 Krasíkov
 Kunvald
 Lanškroun
 Leština
 Letohrad
 Libecina
 Libchavy
 Lichkov
 Líšnice
 Lubník
 Lukavice
 Luková
 Mistrovice
 Mladkov
 Mostek
 Nasavrky
 Nekoř
 Nové Hrady
 Orlické Podhůří
 Orličky
 Ostrov
 Oucmanice
 Pastviny
 Petrovice
 Písečná
 Plchovice
 Podlesí
 Přívrat
 Pustina
 Radhošť
 Řepníky
 Řetová
 Řetůvka
 Rudoltice
 Rybník
 Sázava
 Seč
 Šedivec
 Semanín
 Skořenice
 Slatina
 Sobkovice
 Sopotnice
 Sruby
 Stradouň
 Strážná
 Studené
 Sudislav nad Orlicí
 Sudslava
 Svatý Jiří
 Tatenice
 Těchonín
 Tisová
 Trpík
 Třebovice
 Týnišťko
 Újezd u Chocně
 Ústí nad Orlicí
 Velká Skrovnice
 Verměřovice
 Vinary
 Voděrady
 Vraclav
 Vračovice-Orlov
 Výprachtice
 Vysoké Mýto
 Záchlumí
 Zádolí
 Zálší
 Žamberk
 Žampach
 Zámrsk
 Zářecká Lhota
 Žichlínek

References

External links

List of towns and villages of the Ústí nad Orlicí District

 
Districts of the Czech Republic